John William Watts (13 April 1931 – March 2006) was an English footballer who made more than 200 appearances in the Football League for Birmingham City playing as a right half.

Watts was born in the Vauxhall district of Birmingham. He joined Birmingham City as a junior in 1948 and turned professional in 1951 after completing his National Service. In a twelve-year professional career with the club he played 248 games in all competitions, scoring three times. In 1964 he joined Nuneaton Borough of the Southern League where he was to spend four years. He played briefly for West Midlands (Regional) League club Bromsgrove Rovers before retiring in 1969.

Watts died in a retirement home in Brownhills, West Midlands, in March 2006.

Honours
Birmingham City
 Football League Second Division: 1954–55
 Inter-Cities Fairs Cup finalist: 1958–60
Nuneaton Borough
 Southern League runner-up: 1966–67

References

1931 births
2006 deaths
Footballers from Birmingham, West Midlands
English footballers
Association football wing halves
Birmingham City F.C. players
Nuneaton Borough F.C. players
Bromsgrove Rovers F.C. players
English Football League players
Southern Football League players